Minuscule 494 (in the Gregory-Aland numbering), ε 437 (in the Soden numbering), is a Greek minuscule manuscript of the New Testament, on parchment. Palaeographically it has been assigned to the 14th-century. 
The manuscript is lacunose, full marginalia. The manuscript was adapted to the liturgical use.

Description 

The codex contains the text of the four Gospels on 222 parchment leaves (size ) with some lacunae (Mark 6:56-7:17; 10:8-25; Luke 8:37-51; 11:17-32; 20:20-21:2; 24:26-53; John 1:1-22). The text is written in one column per page, 23 lines per page. It has itacistic errors.

There is also a division according to the smaller Ammonian Sections, with references to the Eusebian Canons.

It has marginal notes.

Text 

The Greek text of the codex is a representative of the Byzantine text-type. Aland placed it in Category V.
Hermann von Soden included it to the textual family Kx. According to the Claremont Profile Method it creates cluster with 343 in Luke 1 and Luke 10. In Luke 20 it has mixed Byzantine text (Luke 20 is a fragmentary).

It has some unique readings and many corrections.

History 

The manuscript was bought for the British Museum from J. Greville Chester in 1884. It was added to the list of New Testament manuscripts by Gregory.

The manuscript is not cited in critical editions of the Greek New Testament.

It is currently housed at the British Library (Add MS 32341) in London.

See also 

 List of New Testament minuscules
 Biblical manuscript
 Textual criticism

References

Further reading 

 

Greek New Testament minuscules
14th-century biblical manuscripts
British Library additional manuscripts